Nikolai Eivindssøn Astrup (born 12 June 1978) is a Norwegian politician representing the Conservative Party. He served as Minister of Local Government from 2020 to 2021. Previously he served as the Minister of International Development from 2018 to 2019 in Prime Minister Erna Solberg's cabinet, being the first since Heikki Holmås from 2012 to 2013. In 2019, he also became the first Minister of Digitalization after the Christian Democratic Party joined the Cabinet, a post he served in until 2020.

Education
Astrup graduated from Institut Le Rosey with an International General Certificate of Secondary Education (1995) and from Berg Upper Secondary School with an International Baccalaureate (1997). He holds a master's degree in European Politics and Governance and a bachelor's degree in International Relations, both from the London School of Economics and Political Science (LSE).

Early career
Astrup worked in management consulting at Arkwright from 2000 until 2002. Between 2001 and 2008 he was the editor of the conservative periodical Minerva.

Prior to his election to parliament, Astrup worked as political adviser for the Conservative Party parliamentary group and political adviser to the Governing Mayor of Oslo Erling Lae from 2008 until 2009.

Political career

Parliament
Ahead of the 2009 election for parliament, Astrup was nominated as the Conservative Party's fourth candidate for Oslo, considered the last safe seat; he defeated Inge Lønning in the nomination. Astrup was elected Member of Parliament in 2009 and leader of the Conservative Party in Oslo in 2012 and has previously been leader of the Oslo Norwegian Young Conservatives.
 
Ahead of the election in 2013 Astrup was nominated as the second candidate for Oslo, behind the Minister of Defence, Ine Eriksen Søreide. Due to his relatively young age, he was considered a rising star in the party at the time. After the elections, Astrup was appointed as vice-chair of the Conservative Party Parliamentary Group, and he was re-appointed to this position after the 2017 election.

In parliament, Astrup sat on the Standing Committee on Energy and the Environment from 2009 to 2015, and from 2016 to 2017 he chaired the Standing Committee on Transport and Communication. After the election in 2017 he was appointed chair of the Standing Committee on Finance and is the Conservative's spokesperson on issues relating to these issues. For a number of years Astrup was also spokesperson on European affairs.

Minister
Astrup entered the Solberg cabinet in 2018 as minister of international development, a post he held until 2019. That year he was appointed minister of digitisation, and the year after, minister of local government.

Minister of International Development
Following the Liberal Party’s entrance into the Solberg cabinet, Astrup was appointed minister of international development, the first person to hold the post in six years.

In his capacity as minister, Astrup was appointed by United Nations Secretary General António Guterres in 2018 to the High-level Panel on Digital Cooperation, co-chaired by Melinda Gates and Jack Ma.

Minister of Digitalisation
After the Christian Democratic Party entered government on 22 January 2019, Astrup was appointed minister of digitalisation, the first of its kind.

Minister of Local Government
After the Progress Party withdrew from government, Astrup was appointed minister of local government, succeeding Monica Mæland, who had been appointed minister of justice. Astrup championed the implementation of the Sustainability Development Goals (SDG) in all of government and local municipalities, being among the first countries to localize the 2030-agenda, as the Norwegian prime minister Erna Solberg was the UN Secretary General's co-chair for the SDGs.

Later career 
In 2022, Astrup was Norway's candidate to succeed Susanna Moorehead as chair of the Organisation for Economic Co-operation and Development’s Development Assistance Committee; in the final vote, he lost to Carsten Staur, who won the support of 16 members in the ballot compared to Astrup’s 13.

Other activities

International organizations
 Asian Infrastructure Investment Bank (AIIB), Ex-Officio Member of the Board of Governors (2018-2019)
 Multilateral Investment Guarantee Agency (MIGA), World Bank Group, Ex-Officio Member of the Board of Governors (2018-2019)
 World Bank, Ex-Officio Member of the Board of Governors (2018-2019)

Corporate boards
 Pactum AS, Member of the Board (2010-2015)

Non-profit organizations
 European Movement in Norway, Vice-President (2012-2013)

Recognition
In March 2011, Astrup was named the "European of the Year" by the JEF Norway.

Personal life
In 2017, Astrup’s estimated net worth was $40 million, making him the wealthiest member of Parliament.

References

External links

 Astrup, Nikolai  ( 1978-  ) Entry on Stortinget's website. 

1978 births
Living people
Conservative Party (Norway) politicians
Members of the Storting
Politicians from Oslo
21st-century Norwegian politicians
Government ministers of Norway
Ministers of Local Government and Modernisation of Norway
Ministers of International Development of Norway
Alumni of the London School of Economics
Alumni of Institut Le Rosey